West Virginia's 3rd congressional district is an obsolete U.S. congressional district in southern West Virginia. At various times the district covered different parts of the state, but in its final form included the state's second-largest city, Huntington; included Bluefield, Princeton, and Beckley; and has a long history of coal mining (especially in the southwestern counties), forestry, and farming.

The district was last represented by Republican Carol Miller. However, because West Virginia lost a congressional seat in the 2020 census, it was eliminated in 2023. On October 22, 2021, Governor Jim Justice signed the new congressional map plans into law. Under the plan, all of the current 3rd would be part of the new 1st. Incumbent representative Miller announced her candidacy for the new 1st district.

Character 
The district grew in geographic size over the years, as it contained the area of the state that lost the most population. Most of the congressmen listed below prior to the 1992 election cycle actually represented other parts of the state, as most of the recent 3rd district's history was found in the also obsolete 4th, 5th, and 6th districts.

The last version of the 3rd district began to take shape in the 1960s. For much of its history, the 4th district had been focused on Huntington and the mill towns and farm communities north of that city along the Ohio River, while the 5th and 6th districts were focused on the then safely Democratic coal fields. In the 1970 redistricting, the 5th (which had absorbed most of the 6th due to population loss 10 years earlier) was eliminated, and most of its territory was merged into the 4th to form what is now the western half of the 3rd. In the 1990 redistricting the old 4th was renumbered as the 3rd and took in what is now the eastern half of its current shape from a previous version of the 2nd district.

The major areas of the last version of the district included the industrial and university city of Huntington, the coal producing southwestern part of the state, and the more conservative farm and timber region of the southeastern part of the state. 2010 census figures again showed a major population loss, and Mason County was transferred from the 2nd to the 3rd district. This did not change the character of the district in a significant way.

Despite the strength of Democrats at the local and state level, in presidential elections the district followed the increasing Republican trend in West Virginia. While Bill Clinton twice carried the district handily in three-way races, Al Gore had just narrowly won the district in 2000 with 51% of the vote. George W. Bush won the district in 2004 with 53% of the vote, and John McCain carried the district in 2008 with 55.76% of the vote, continuing the district, and the state's rightward shift despite a large shift towards the Democrats nationally in 2008. In 2012, the district shifted significantly towards the Republicans yet again, with Republican Mitt Romney defeating President Barack Obama 65.0% to 32.8% in the district. In 2016, the district shifted even further towards the Republican Party, with Republican Donald Trump defeating Democrat Hillary Clinton (wife of Bill Clinton, who carried the district by significant margins in the 1992 and 1996 presidential elections), by a massive margin of 72.5% to 23.3%.

Obsolete 
The district became obsolete following the 2020 United States census.

Statewide election results
Election results from presidential races:

History

The third district, as originally formed in 1863, included Kanawha, Jackson, Mason, Putnam, Cabell, Clay, Wayne, Logan, Boone, Braxton, Nicholas, Roane and McDowell counties. It was essentially the successor of Virginia's 12th congressional district.

In 1882, the district was reformed to include Logan, Wyoming, McDowell, Mercer, Raleigh, Boone, Kanawha, Fayette, Clay, Nicholas, Greenbrier, Monroe, Summers, Webster, Pocahontas, and Upshur counties. In 1902, Logan, Wyoming, McDowell, Raleigh, Boone and Mercer were removed. In 1916 the district was, more or less, renumbered as the new 6th district, and the 3rd was totally reconstituted as Ritchie, Doddridge, Harrison, Calhoun, Gilmer, Lewis, Upshur, Braxton, Clay, Nicholas, and Webster counties.  In 1934, Fayette was added. In 1952, Wirt was added. In 1962, the district was again totally broken up and reconstituted as Boone, Clay, Kanawha, Nicholas and Raleigh. In 1972, Raleigh was removed and Ritchie, Wirt, Gilmer, Calhoun, Mason, Jackson, Roane, Braxton, Putnam, Lincoln, and Boone were added. In 1982, Lewis was added.

The district's last configuration dated from the 1990 round of redistricting.  From 1992 to 2002, it consisted of Boone, Cabell, Fayette, Greenbrier, Lincoln, Logan, McDowell, Mercer, Mingo, Monroe, Pocahontas, Raleigh, Summers, Wayne, Webster, and Wyoming.  In 2002, Nicholas was added.  For the 2012 cycle, Mason was added.  All of the counties of the last version of the district are now part of the 1st District.

List of members representing the district

Recent election results

2000s

2010s

2020s

Historical district boundaries

See also

West Virginia's congressional districts
List of United States congressional districts

References
Specific

General

 Congressional Biographical Directory of the United States 1774–present

03
Constituencies established in 1863
1863 establishments in West Virginia
Constituencies disestablished in 2023
2023 disestablishments in West Virginia